Arhopala anamuta is a butterfly in the family Lycaenidae. It was described by Georg Semper in 1890.
It is found in the Indomalayan realm where it is endemic to the Philippines.

References

External links

Arhopala Boisduval, 1832 at Markku Savela's Lepidoptera and Some Other Life Forms. Retrieved June 3, 2017.

Arhopala
Butterflies described in 1890